The first cabinet of Andrej Babiš was the governing body of the Czech Republic from 13 December 2017 until it was succeeded by the second cabinet of Andrej Babiš on 27 June 2018. Andrej Babiš was designated Prime Minister by President Miloš Zeman on 6 December 2017. The cabinet was appointed on 13 December 2017. It consisted of 14 ministers.

On 16 January 2018 the cabinet failed a confidence vote in the Chamber of Deputies of the Czech Republic, by 78 to 117.

Government Ministers 

|}

References 

Andrej Babiš
Czech government cabinets
2017 establishments in the Czech Republic
Cabinets established in 2017
ANO 2011
2017 Czech legislative election